Pan Pacific or Pan Pac can refer to:

Pan-Pacific Auditorium, a former auditorium in Los Angeles
Pan-Pacific Championship, an association football championship, begun in 2008
Pan Pac Forest Products Ltd, a forestry company based in New Zealand
Pan Pacific Hotels and Resorts
Pan Pacific Swimming Championships, begun in 1985
Toray Pan Pacific Open, a WTA Tour affiliated professional tennis tournament for women
Pan Pacific International Holdings (PPIH), the Japan-based parent company of Don Quijote, Marukai Corporation U.S.A., and Times Supermarkets